Johan Berisha (born 6 September 1979 in Yugoslavia) is a retired Swiss footballer of Albanian descent.

Football career
Berisha stands at 6"2 and he uses this height to his advantage when challenging defenders in aerial battles and his strength means that he can hold the ball up to bring teammates into play, making him very useful when employed by his team as target man. However, ball control and accurate passing also means that he can also be useful in a slightly deeper attacking midfield role, where he is able to get possession of the ball more often and create chances for his teammates. A relatively poor-scoring record is compensated for his contribution to the team in other areas, most notably the number of assists that he provides.

Berisha has previously played for Neuchâtel Xamax, FC Thun, BSC Young Boys and FC Aarau in the Swiss Super League.

References

1979 births
Living people
Swiss men's footballers
Switzerland under-21 international footballers
FC Aarau players
FC Thun players
Neuchâtel Xamax FCS players
BSC Young Boys players
Kosovan emigrants to Switzerland
Swiss Super League players
Association football forwards